Juniper Gulf is a pit cave in on the side of Ingleborough in Yorkshire, England. 
It is a popular single rope technique (SRT) trip for cavers, especially known for its final  pitch.

References

Caves of North Yorkshire